Larsen Nunatak is an island called nunatak  north of Murdoch Nunatak in the Seal Nunataks group, off the east coast of the Antarctic Peninsula. The Seal Nunataks were discovered by a Norwegian whaling expedition under C.A. Larsen in December 1893, and commemoration of Larsen was proposed by Ludwig Friederichsen in 1895. The application of this name is based upon a 1947 survey by the Falkland Islands Dependencies Survey.

References

Islands of Graham Land
Oscar II Coast